David Gerard Perkins (born November 12, 1957) is a retired United States Army four-star general. His last assignment before retiring was commanding general of the United States Army Training and Doctrine Command.

Early life
Perkins was born in Goffstown, New Hampshire, on November 12, 1957, and was raised in Keene, New Hampshire; Rochester, New York; and Fairport, New York. Perkins earned his Boy Scouts of America Eagle Scout award in 1974, and graduated from Fairport High School in 1976.

Military career
Perkins graduated from the United States Military Academy at West Point in 1980 and was commissioned as a second lieutenant of Armor.  In 1988, he received a Master of Science degree in mechanical engineering from the University of Michigan. He completed both Ranger and Airborne Schools. He then served in armor assignments from platoon leader to battalion and brigade staff positions.

Perkins commanded the 1st Battalion, 63rd Armor Regiment from 1996 to 1998. The battalion served in Macedonia, and took part in a United Nations mission to monitor Macedonia's borders with Albania, Kosovo, and Serbia. In 1999, Perkins received a master's degree from the Naval War College.

In 2003, Perkins commanded the 2nd Brigade, 3rd Infantry Division during the invasion of Iraq. His unit was the first across the border, and first to enter the downtown government areas of Baghdad. Perkins is featured prominently in the book Thunder Run: The Armored Strike to Capture Baghdad, and received the Silver Star for his part in the invasion.

In 2004 and 2005, Perkins was executive assistant to the Vice Chairman of the Joint Chiefs of Staff. From 2005 to 2007, he commanded the Joint Multinational Training Command in Germany. From 2007 to 2008, Perkins was the G-3 (Plans, Operations and Training staff officer) for United States Army Europe and Seventh United States Army.

In 2008, Perkins became the director for strategic effects (CJ-9) for Multi-National Force-Iraq. In this capacity, he coordinated and implemented political, economic, and communications activities on behalf of MNF-I, and served as the organization's spokesman. From 2009 to 2011, he commanded the 4th Infantry Division at Fort Carson. From 2011 to 2014, Perkins was commander of the Combined Arms Center and commandant of the United States Army Command and General Staff College at Fort Leavenworth.

On March 14, 2014, Perkins assumed command of United States Army Training and Doctrine Command (TRADOC) from Robert W. Cone. On March 2, 2018, Perkins was succeeded at TRADOC by Stephen J. Townsend and he retired one week later.

Awards and decorations

Family
Perkins and his wife Ginger are the parents of two children, Cassandra and Chad, both of whom are captains in the United States Army as of March 2018.

References

1957 births
Living people
People from Goffstown, New Hampshire
People from Fairport, New York
United States Military Academy alumni
University of Michigan College of Engineering alumni
United States Army Command and General Staff College alumni
Naval War College alumni
United States Army personnel of the Iraq War
Recipients of the Distinguished Service Medal (US Army)
Recipients of the Silver Star
Recipients of the Defense Superior Service Medal
Commandants of the United States Army Command and General Staff College
United States Army generals
People from Keene, New Hampshire
Military personnel from New Hampshire